Bicellonycha is a genus of fireflies in the beetle family Lampyridae. There are more than 40 described species in Bicellonycha.

Species
These 42 species belong to the genus Bicellonycha:

 Bicellonycha albomarginata Zaragoza, 1989
 Bicellonycha amoena (Gorham, 1880)
 Bicellonycha atra Pic, 1927
 Bicellonycha bipartita Pic, 1927
 Bicellonycha boliviana Zaragoza, 1989
 Bicellonycha brasiliana Zaragoza, 1989
 Bicellonycha bruchi E. Olivier, 1911
 Bicellonycha brunneonotata Pic, 1930
 Bicellonycha catharina Zaragoza, 1989
 Bicellonycha championi Zaragoza, 1989
 Bicellonycha collaris Gorham, 1880
 Bicellonycha colombiana Zaragoza, 1989
 Bicellonycha crassa Gorham, 1884
 Bicellonycha cyathigera (Gorham, 1881)
 Bicellonycha deleta (Motschulsky, 1854)
 Bicellonycha depressa (E. Olivier, 1886)
 Bicellonycha dimidiata (Blanchard in Brullé, 1846)
 Bicellonycha discicollis (Gorham, 1881)
 Bicellonycha gibba Pic, 1930
 Bicellonycha gorhami Zaragoza, 1989
 Bicellonycha limbata Pic, 1924
 Bicellonycha lineola (Blanchard in Brullé, 1846)
 Bicellonycha lividipennis Motschulsky, 1854
 Bicellonycha lucidicollis Gorham, 1880
 Bicellonycha melanura Motschulsky, 1854
 Bicellonycha mexicana Gorham, 1880
 Bicellonycha multilineata Pic, 1930
 Bicellonycha oliveri Zaragoza, 1989
 Bicellonycha ornaticollis (Blanchard in Brullé, 1846)
 Bicellonycha panamensis Zaragoza, 1989
 Bicellonycha peruana Zaragoza, 1989
 Bicellonycha pici Zaragoza, 1989
 Bicellonycha postcutellaris Pic, 1927
 Bicellonycha pulchella E. Olivier, 1886
 Bicellonycha rospigliosi Brèthes, 1920
 Bicellonycha ruficollis (Gorham, 1880)
 Bicellonycha sallei Zaragoza, 1989
 Bicellonycha signata (E. Olivier, 1886)
 Bicellonycha stigmatica (E. Olivier, 1886)
 Bicellonycha tenuicornis (E. Olivier, 1886)
 Bicellonycha thiemeni Zaragoza, 1989
 Bicellonycha wickershamorum Cicero, 1982

References

Further reading

 
 
 

Lampyridae
Lampyridae genera
Bioluminescent insects
Articles created by Qbugbot